Cyperus aggregatus, commonly known as the inflatedscale flatsedge, is a species of sedge that is native to the Americas.

See also
List of Cyperus species

References

aggregatus
Taxa named by Stephan Endlicher
Plants described in 1842
Flora of Brazil
Flora of Argentina
Flora of Mexico
Flora of Peru
Flora of Chile
Flora of Texas
Flora of Alabama
Flora of Arizona
Flora of Belize
Flora of Bolivia
Flora of Colombia
Flora of Costa Rica
Flora of Cuba
Flora of the Dominican Republic
Flora of Ecuador
Flora of El Salvador
Flora of French Guiana
Flora of Guatemala
Flora of Guyana
Flora of Haiti
Flora of Honduras
Flora of Jamaica
Flora of Louisiana
Flora of Mississippi
Flora of New Mexico
Flora of Nicaragua
Flora of Paraguay
Flora of Panama
Flora of Puerto Rico
Flora of Suriname
Flora of Uruguay
Flora of Venezuela
Flora without expected TNC conservation status